Altigarron is a townland in County Antrim, Northern Ireland. It is situated in the historic barony of Belfast Upper and the civil parish of Shankill and covers an area of 694 acres

The name derives from the Irish: Alt a Gharrain (glen of the copse).

The population of the townland decreased during the 19th century:

See also 
List of townlands in County Antrim

References

Townlands of County Antrim
Barony of Belfast Upper